The Military General Governorate of Serbia was a military administration established by the Austro-Hungarian Army during the Austro-Hungarian occupation of Serbia. The Governorate existed from 1 January 1916 to 1 November 1918 during World War I. Along with Bulgarian occupied Serbia, it was one of the two separate occupation zones created after the Kingdom of Serbia was invaded and partitioned by the Central Powers.

History 

During the unsuccessful Austro-Hungarian Serbian campaign of 1914, a first military governorate was set up in Belgrade by the Austrian Supreme Command. Field-Marshal Stjepan Sarkotić, commander of the Devils's Division, was appointed military governor in November. The Serbian army’s counteroffensive a month later liberated the country, ending the short-lived occupation. Following the Central Powers' Serbian campaign of 1915 and the subsequent retreat of the Serbian army, the country was divided into three zones of control, Austria-Hungarian, German and Bulgarian.

The Austro-Hungarian zone encompassed the northwestern part of Serbia, with Belgrade as its administrative centre, to the north-east corner near Negotin. The areas east of the Morava, Macedonia itself and most of Kosovo fell under Bulgarian occupation. The Germans decided not to seek territory for themselves but took control instead of railways, mines, forestry, and agricultural resources in both occupied zones; in the area east of Velika Morava, Južna Morava in Kosovo and the Vardar valley. The Austro-Hungarian occupiers established a similar military administration in the territory of the Kingdom of Montenegro.

The Austro-Hungarian Military Governorate in Serbia was officially started on 1 January 1916 by order of the Austro-Hungarian Supreme Command.

Governance

The MGG/S was directly subordinated to the Austro-Hungarian Army High Command under Franz Conrad von Hötzendorf and later Arthur Arz von Straußenburg.

General Johann Graf von Salis-Seewis, a Croat by ethnicity, was appointed Military Governor-General by the Emperor at the end of 1915, he assumed his position on 6 January 1916. The governor-general was supported by Chief of Staff, Lieutenant Colonel Otto Gellinek, who been military attaché in Belgrade before the war.

General von Salis-Seewis was replaced by General Adolf Freiherr von Rhemen on 6 July 1916, while Colonel Hugo Kerchnawe succeeded Lieutenant Colonel Otto Gellinek.

A civilian commissioner was appointed by the Hungarian government, to assist the military governor-general. Dr. Ludwig (Lajos) Thallóczy, a Hungarian historian and Balkan expert, took office on 17 January 1916. After his accidental death in December 1916, he was succeeded by Teodor Kušević in January 1917.

Four administrative departments were set up: military, economic, judicial, and political, with the latter under future Ustaše leader Slavko Kvaternik.

Administrative divisions 
The administrative divisions initially consisted of five county commands or provinces, based on pre-war Serbia’s counties, as established during the brief occupation of 1914. After March 1916 the divisions came up to a total of twelve provinces plus the city of Belgrade: Each of the twelve provinces, were ruled by a commander who was responsible for all military and civil affairs. The provinces were additionally divided into sixty-four districts.

After the Austro–Bulgarian confrontation of April 1916, the cities of Prizren and Pristina in Kosovo were subordinated to the Austro-Hungarian governorate.

Dissolution 
In mid October 1918, overwhelmed by the Allies offensive spearheaded by Serbian and French troops, Governor Hermann von Kövess ordered a retreat of all the remaining Austro-Hungarian personal behind the Danube, Save and Drina rivers; Belgrade was liberated on 30 October, thus ending the Military General Governorate of Serbia.

See also 
 Austro-Hungarian occupation of Serbia
 Bulgarian occupation of Serbia
 Serbian Campaign
 List of administrators of occupied Serbia during World War I

Notes

References

Sources 

 
 
   
 
 
 
 
 
 
 
 
 
 
 
 

 
Politics of World War I
States and territories established in 1916
States and territories disestablished in 1918